is a Japanese gravure idol, actress and television personality known for her role as Sayaka Honiden in the 2012 Super Sentai parody series Unofficial Sentai Akibaranger. She is affiliated with Biscuit Entertainment, a subsidiary of Watanabe Entertainment.

Filmography

TV series
Kore Kara (2007)
Hiruobi! (2010)
Quiz Present Variety Q-sama! (2011)
Unofficial Sentai Akibaranger as Sayaka Honiden (2012)

DVD
 (2011)
 (2011)

References

External links
Official profile at Watanabe Entertainment 
Official blog at Ameba 

Japanese gravure idols
1987 births
Living people
People from Hyōgo Prefecture